Joshua Gardner is the name of:

 Joshua Gardner (sea captain) (fl. 1820), American sea captain from Nantucket and discoverer of Gardner Island
 Josh Gardner (soccer) (born 1982), American soccer player
 Josh Gardner (comedian) (born 1971), American comedian and writer